Ibn Khaldun (507) was a training frigate of the Iraqi Navy that was built in SFR Yugoslavia. Later the frigate was renamed to Ibn Marjid. She has a near sister ship, the Indonesian corvette .

Design and description
She was also equipped with controllable pitch propeller.

The ship has a complement of 93 personnel, with the addition of 100 cadets for training purpose. She was armed with one Bofors 57 mm L/70 Mk 1 naval gun, one Bofors 40 mm Automatic Gun L/70, and four 20 mm Rheinmetall Mk 20 Rh-202 autocannons in twin mount. The ship also armed with two  torpedo tubes and one GM 101/41 depth charge projector. She was designed to be able to carry four MM38 Exocet anti-ship missiles with two launchers, but the launchers itself were never fitted. As a training ship, Ibn Khaldun has classroom and additional bridge, navigation room, radio room, and accommodations.

Her electronic system and sensors consisted of Philips Elektronik 9LV200 Mk 2 fire control radar, two Racal Decca 1229 surface search/navigation radars, a hull-mounted sonar, and electronic countermeasure-electronic support measures suite.

Construction and career

The ship was laid down in 1977 at Uljanik Shipyard, SFR Yugoslavia and she was launched in 1978. Ibn Khaldun was commissioned on 20 March 1980.

She was mainly used for training and as transport between Europe and Gulf of Aqaba during Iran–Iraq War. The ship was still operational in 1988, despite several Iranian claims that she had been sunk.

Ibn Khaldun was severely damaged by air attacks while at Basra in February 1991 as the result of Operation Desert Storm. The ship was later renamed to Ibn Marjid. Ibn Marjid survived the Gulf War, but her overall condition was deteriorating and she lacked spare parts for her Roll-Royce engines. She was able to sailed briefly in March 2003 during the U.S. invasion of Iraq, but later was sunk at harbor by air attacks.

See also

References

Bibliography

External links
F507 Ibn Marjid Frigate - Iraqi Armed Forces Forums منتدى القوات المسلحة العراقية
Scale model of "IBN MARJID" F 507

1978 ships
Frigates of the Iraqi Navy
Ships built in Yugoslavia